"Atmosphere" is a song by English post-punk band Joy Division. It was originally released in March 1980 by the Sordide Sentimental label as the "Licht und Blindheit" (German for "Light and Blindness") package, a France-only limited edition single featuring the track "Dead Souls" as the B-side. Following Ian Curtis's death in May, it was re-released as a 12" single by Factory Records in August with "She's Lost Control" as the B-side.

The single was re-released in 1988 to coincide with the release of the compilation album Substance, and a music video was produced for the song.

Recording

Joy Division had written an early version of this song called "Chance" which they recorded for a Manchester radio session in June 1979. They later recorded the final version of Atmosphere in October 1979 with Martin Hannett at Cargo Studio in Rochdale. The Keyboard used in the chorus was a "Woolworth’s Winfield brown Bakelite plastic reed organ."

Release 
The song was originally released on 18 March 1980 by the label Sordide Sentimental as a France-only 7" single under the title "Licht und Blindheit" (German for "Light and Blindness"). It was limited to 1578 copies and featured the track "Dead Souls" as the B-side. John Peel played "Atmosphere" for the first time on his show on 11 March 1980 and "Dead Souls" the following night.

Following the death of lead singer Ian Curtis in May 1980, "Atmosphere" was released as a 12" single along with "She's Lost Control". "Atmosphere" was the A-side for the UK release but the B-side for the USA release. "She's Lost Control" is an alternative version of the one that appears on the band's debut album Unknown Pleasures. The single peaked at number 1 in New Zealand in August 1981, and it would later re-chart there in July 1984 (number 17) and when it was reissued in August 1988 (number 5). "Atmosphere" also reached the top of the UK Indie Chart in October 1980, hit the number 2 spot of that same chart in July 1988,, and hit number 34 in the UK Singles Chart during June 1988.
The single was re-released in 1988 to coincide with the release of the compilation album Substance.

Music video 
A music video was released for the song with the single's re-release in 1988. It contains characters wearing black-hooded cloaks and white burial shrouds carrying around large pictures of the band. It was directed by Anton Corbijn (responsible for much of the early Joy Division photography, and who later directed the Ian Curtis biopic Control).

Reception 
Ned Raggett of AllMusic wrote, "Atmosphere" is another one of those prime Joy Division songs, like "Transmission" or "Love Will Tear Us Apart", where Martin Hannett's production becomes so essential to the end result that it couldn't have been heard otherwise", noting that, in regards to Ian Curtis's mental state and subsequent death, "there's a feeling of a requiem here, an awesome musical farewell."

NME voted the song number 1 in its list "The 20 Greatest Goth Tracks".

Legacy 
The song featured in the film 24 Hour Party People just after Ian Curtis's suicide is portrayed. The song is also used at the end of the Ian Curtis biopic Control. It was also played at Tony Wilson's funeral. "Atmosphere" is used during the final scenes of Hounds of Love, a 2016 Australian thriller, as well.

Joy Division's bassist, Peter Hook, has said he regards the song as one of the band's greatest.

Track listings 
All songs written and composed by Joy Division (Ian Curtis, Peter Hook, Stephen Morris and Bernard Sumner).

 "Licht und Blindheit" (7")

 "Atmosphere" (12")

 1988 re-release
 7"

 12"

 CD

Chart positions

See also 
 Joy Division discography

References

External links 
 
 Accolades archived at Acclaimed Music

Joy Division songs
1980 singles
Number-one singles in New Zealand
Music videos directed by Anton Corbijn
Black-and-white music videos
Rock ballads
Factory Records singles
1980 songs
Songs written by Bernard Sumner
Songs written by Peter Hook
Songs written by Stephen Morris (musician)
Songs written by Ian Curtis
1980s ballads
UK Independent Singles Chart number-one singles